Maynooth is a town in County Kildare, Ireland.

Maynooth may also refer to:
 Maynooth, Ontario, a very small town north of Bancroft, Ontario, Canada